, also known as Lovely Complex, is a romantic comedy shōjo manga by Aya Nakahara. It was published by Shueisha in Bessatsu Margaret from 2001 to 2006 and collected in 17 tankōbon volumes. The series is about the romance between a tall girl and a short boy who are treated as a comedy duo by their classmates. In 2004, it received the 49th Shogakukan Manga Award for shōjo.

The story has been adapted as a live-action movie released in 2006, a 24-episode anime television series broadcast in 2007, and an adventure game released for PlayStation 2 released in 2006. Two drama CDs have also been produced. The manga and the live-action movie are licensed in North America by Viz.

A sequel series called Love Com D (or Lovely Complex Deluxe or "Lovely Complex Two") began serialization in the May 2009 issue of the bimonthly shōjo manga magazine Deluxe Margaret, focusing on Risa's younger brother.

Plot
Love Com is a love story between a boy and a girl in Sakai, Osaka. The boy, Atsushi Ōtani, is —way below the height of the average Japanese boy. Because of this, the pair are called the "All Hanshin Kyojin" after a popular comedy duo that has a similar height difference. The difference in their heights is extremely exaggerated (in the opening credits of the anime, for example, the top of Ōtani's head doesn't even reach Risa's chin when it should be approximately level with her mouth.)

During summer school, a very tall student named Ryouji Suzuki (from another class) shows up and Risa immediately falls for him because he is tall. There is a girl that Atsushi likes as well, so Risa and Atsushi decide to put aside their differences and help each other get their love interests. Their efforts fail spectacularly as Suzuki and the girl whom Ōtani had a crush on - Chiharu Tanaka - end up becoming a couple. All is not lost though, since Risa and Ōtani become close friends. As they get to know each other better, Risa's feelings for Atsushi begin to blossom, and her love life gets complicated from there on.

Almost all of the characters speak in Kansai-ben.

Characters

Drama role by: Ema Fujisawa, 
 The protagonist, Risa Koizumi is not your average Japanese high school girl. In the anime she states that she has always been the tallest person in her class. Ironically, her surname means 'small fountain'. She and other characters compare her to a giraffe. Risa can be impulsive and strong-willed at times, and is rarely willing to display her softer side. She had a crush on Suzuki before he started dating Chiharu.
 Risa starts developing feelings for Ōtani and soon admits to herself that she likes him. She then starts trying to confess. Failing the first time, Nobuko and Nakao try to help with Nobuko often giving Risa advice on what to do. Finally she very directly tells him. She immediately regrets it, and tells Ōtani to pretend it never happened, but in spite of herself she tells Ōtani once again that she likes him. Ōtani responds that he cannot see her as a girlfriend yet, so her new goal is to make Ōtani regret that and make him like her as well.

Drama role by: Teppei Koike, Voice actor for game/drama CD: Takahiro Sakurai
 Atsushi Ōtani is one of the main characters. He is very short for a boy, standing . Like Koizumi, Ōtani's surname (roughly, "big valley") is a pun on his diminutive stature. He can be thoughtless and rude but he is kind and a little silly at heart. Ironically, Ōtani also happens to be the star player of the school basketball team. He reveals he wants to go to University after graduation to get his teaching certificate. He dreams of teaching basketball to elementary school students.
His ex-girlfriend is Mayu Kanzaki, the manager of his middle-school basketball team. She broke up with him for a much taller boyfriend, and this is one of the reasons Ōtani is sensitive about his height. He later finds out that his lack of height wasn't the reason that she broke up with him; it was because she was in love with someone else already who just happened to be tall. He doesn't know quite yet how he feels about Risa when she confesses her feelings for him, and responds that he can't see her as a girlfriend (yet). He later realizes that he does care for her, and he kisses her. Later on in the series, Ōtani gets the wrong idea when Risa does suspicious things with her co-worker Kohori, and then breaks up with her. However, after seeing how devoted she is to him, Ōtani reconsiders and they make up on Christmas Eve.

Drama role by: Nami Tamaki, 
 Fashionable and charming, Nobu is Risa's best friend. She is generally wiser than Risa or Chiharu in the ways of love, and is always ready to offer her advice. She's usually the one who sets up all the 'alone time' moments with Risa and Ōtani. Unfortunately her efforts tend to end in failure and Risa returns to her for comfort. She's utterly in love with her boyfriend, Nakao, and is always calling him her 'honey', 'darling', and 'baby'. Whenever Otani upsets Risa, she and Nakao express their disapproval, usually through means of torture and insults.

Drama role by: Yusuke Yamazaki, Voice actor for game/drama CD: Kenjiro Tsuda
 Nobu's boyfriend and Ōtani's best friend. Considerate, sensitive, mild-mannered and easygoing., Nakao is absolutely dedicated to Nobu, and when he is not playing basketball with Ōtani, he can usually be found helping with her match-making schemes. Despite the fact that Otani is his best friend, Nakao and Nobu-chan are seen multiple times insulting and torturing him, usually after Otani rejects or upsets Risa.

Drama role by: Risa Kudo, 
 One of Risa's closest friends, Chiharu has such a shy, demure personality that she fears most boys her own age. Ōtani once harbored a crush on her (she resembles Kanzaki, his ex-girlfriend, or vice versa), but Chiharu instead fell for the gentle Suzuki. The two are now a couple. When everybody starts making college plans, Suzuki and Chiharu applied for the same college, but Suzuki got rejected. He sadly tells Chiharu somebody else would be able to protect her. For the first time, Chiharu breaks out of her shy character and violently lifts up a desk and throws at him (narrowly missing), frustrated that Suzuki thinks he can be replaced. They later make up and Suzuki promises to join Chiharu in her new school the next year.

Drama role by: Hiro Mizushima, Voice actor for game/drama CD: Masaya Onosaka
 Chiharu's boyfriend. Suzuki's cool demeanor is often mistaken for standoffishness, and so he has few friends. Oblivious to Risa's crush on him, he develops feelings for Chiharu, and eventually asks her out. Like Chiharu, Suzuki is shy and easily embarrassed. When he fails to get into the same university as Chiharu, he promises to try again the year after.

,  Voice actor for game/drama CD: Ryotaro Okiayu
 A handsome, effeminate young man who developed a childhood crush on Risa when she defended him from a gang of bullies. Though he is popular with many of the other girls (dating seven at a time and towards chapter 52 dates 2 more for a total of nine), he says it's all preparation for when he goes out with Risa, despite the fact that she always rejects him. According to Risa, his grandmother is English. It is also suggested that he might have a crush on Seiko. He never tires of insulting Otani, (his most frequently used insult is "Midget"), and is constantly pestering Risa about her feelings for him, stating that Otani isn't good enough for her.

Drama role by: Mio Kato, 
 She is Ōtani's ex-girlfriend. She and Chiharu look very similar, which is the most likely reason that Ōtani had a crush on Chiharu. They started dating in middle-school, and she was the manager for the school basketball team. She broke up with him because she was in love with someone else who was tall, leaving him completely heartbroken and causing his inferiority complex.
She invites Ōtani to the team Christmas party, and though Ōtani accepts, he ends up going to the Umibōzu concert with Risa instead. She then visited Ōtani's school to see him, but encountered Risa and Nobu. Risa is convinced that Ōtani is still in love with Mayu, so she goes to clear up a misunderstanding. It is then that Mayu tells him that she did not break up with him because of his height. However, she appears again later, after having broken up with her boyfriend. When she asks to meet up again, he says "Sorry, I can't because if I do there'll be an idiot who'll cry."

Drama role by: Shosuke Tanihara, 
 Student teacher at Risa and Ōtani's school. Maitake, who prefers the nickname "Maity" or "Mighty", is taller than Risa and extraordinarily good-looking. He bears a resemblance to "Cain-sama", a character in one of Risa's favorite visual novels, and soon acquires a legion of female fans. Gaining affection from Risa, Ōtani soon becomes jealous and quickly starts to realize his feelings for her. It is later revealed he has a fiance - named Jody - much to the disappointment of his fan club - and that he is Haruka's cousin.

 Ōtani's next door neighbor. She is in love with Ōtani and brings him milk every day in hopes that he would one day grow taller. She is about the same height as Risa. Mimi harbors a burning hatred and jealousy for Risa because (despite her having the same height issue as Mimi) she had won Ōtani's heart. She comically switches between her alter egos, acting sweet towards Ōtani, yet sour to Risa behind his back. Eventually, she accepts that Ōtani likes Koizumi but swears that she will someday take Ōtani from Koizumi.

 A young student who works part time with Risa in Ikebe. He is notably shorter than her, although slightly taller than Ōtani (158 cm.), and has distinctive black hair with a red streak. Risa soon discovers that he is also an avid Umibouzu fan. He very soon develops feelings for Risa, who admits to herself that she finds him 'cute'.  Against her better judgment, Risa attends an Umibōzu concert with Kohori which leads to complications in her relationship with Ōtani. He even proclaims his love for Risa, which causes Ōtani to give him a right hook. Around chapter 60 in the manga, Risa's classmate Abe is shown to have a crush on Kohori and is dating him.

 A blonde who has a large crush on Ōtani. She is transgender and was born a male, and states that God placed her in a wrong body. She prefers to be called Seiko instead of Seishiro (birth name) because it sounds more feminine. She kissed Ōtani to confess her feelings while she is tending to Ōtani's injury in the school infirmary. Ōtani got a shock when he found out Seiko's real sex, but still chooses to be her friend. In the manga, she has a crush on Haruka and confessed to him in the same manner she did with Ōtani. When Seiko was planning on confessing to a man who saved her from a creeper, her voice became deeper and not "cute", therefore Seiko cut her long hair and decided to become "a dangerous man", choosing Ōtani as her master. But then it seemed that only a cold was making Seiko's voice change, and she went back to her chirpy, female self.

Drama role by: Susumu Terajima, 
 A popular rapper whom both Risa and Ōtani are avid fans of, leading to Nobu's suggestion that the two are compatible. Risa and Ōtani accidentally cross paths with Umibōzu while on a class trip, and learn that he is actually a devoted family man, with a wife and son with a similar story of how they became a couple. He is named after the mythological creature Umibōzu due to his bald head.

 The manager in charge at the restaurant where Risa works.  She wears glasses and is quite nosy. When she is intoxicated, she turns wild, and does things that she won't remember the next day.

 Homeroom teacher at Risa and Ōtani's class. He gave Risa and Atsushi the nickname "All Hanshin Kyojin."
Risa's senpai
Drama role by: Shugo Oshinari
Dancing Yoshiko
Drama role by: Eiji Wentz

Creation and development

According to the afterword of volume 6, Ōtani ("big valley") was going to be named Nakatani ("middle valley"), but Aya Nakahara changed her mind because naka was "too middlin'."

Media

Manga
The manga was written and illustrated by Aya Nakahara. It was initially serialized in Japan by Shueisha in the shōjo (aimed at teenage girls) manga magazine Bessatsu Margaret from September 2001 to December 2006. The untitled chapters were collected in 17 tankōbon volumes. The manga is licensed in English in North America by Viz Media, with 16 volumes published as of January 2010. The Viz edition is licensed for distribution in Australia and New Zealand by Madman Entertainment, which released volume one in May 2008. The series is also licensed in France by Delcourt, in Italy by Planet Manga, in Mexico by Grupo Editorial Vid, in Spain by Planeta DeAgostini, in Taiwan by Tong Li Publishing, in Hungary by Mangafan and in Vietnam by TVM Comics.

Movie

Love Com was adapted as a live-action movie directed by Kitaji Ishikawa with screenplay by Osamu Suzuki. It starred Ema Fujisawa as Risa Koizumi and Teppei Koike as Atsushi Ōtani. It was released in theaters on 2006-07-15, and on DVD on 2007-01-01. An English-subtitled DVD was released in North America by Viz Media on 2008-02-19.

Anime
The anime television series was produced by Toei Animation and directed by Konosuke Uda, with music by Hironosuke Sato and character designs by Hideaki Maniwa. Say!" by Hey! Say! 7 (episodes 14–24). It was broadcast on TBS, CBC, and MBS from 7 April 2007 to 29 September 2007.

The Italian distributor Dynit licensed the anime for a DVD release. In Italy was broadcast on 24 October 2010 on Rai 4 and ended on 17 April 2011.

In April 2012, Discotek Media announced that they will distribute the Love Com anime on DVD in North America in one subtitled boxset.

Reception

Love Com received the 2004 Shogakukan Manga Award for shōjo manga.

The English edition of Love Com has been favorably reviewed, with praise especially for Nakahara's comedic timing, sympathetic characters, and deft depictions of emotions. A reviewer at Anime News Network praised it as "the standard by which all other modern romantic comedies should be measured" for its handling of the range of its characters' emotions. The first volume was named by the Young Adult Library Services Association as among the best graphic novels for teens for 2007.

The live-action movie of Love Com was named by Young Adult Library Services Association as one of 16 movies that are 2009 Fabulous Films for Young Adults on the theme of coming of age around the world.

References

Further reading

External links
 Shueisha's manga website 
 Toei Animation's anime website 
 Official movie website 
 Official PS2 game website 
 Viz Media's manga website
 Madman Entertainment's manga website
 

2001 manga
2006 films
2009 manga
2000s Japanese-language films
Anime series based on manga
Discotek Media
Japanese romantic comedy films
Films set in Osaka Prefecture
Live-action films based on manga
Mainichi Broadcasting System original programming
Manga adapted into films
New People films
Osaka Prefecture in fiction
Romantic comedy anime and manga
School life in anime and manga
Shōjo manga
Shueisha franchises
Shueisha manga
TBS Television (Japan) original programming
Toei Animation television
Transgender in anime and manga
Viz Media manga
Winners of the Shogakukan Manga Award for shōjo manga